The 2023 Swedish Speedway season is the 2023 season of motorcycle speedway in Sweden.

In February 2023, Masarna pulled out of the 2023 Elitserien due to financial difficulties. They were the second club in two successive years to have pulled out of the league.

Individual

Swedish Individual Speedway Championship

Swedish U21 Championship

Team

Elitserien
Clubs

Quarter-finals

Semi-finals

Final

Allsvenskan (second tier league)
Clubs

Semi-finals

Final

Swedish Division One (third tier league)

See also 
 Speedway in Sweden

References

Speedway leagues
Professional sports leagues in Sweden
Swedish
speedway
Seasons in Swedish speedway
Swedish